Régis Rothenbühler (born 11 October 1970) is a retired Swiss football player.

He played as a defender mostly for Neuchâtel Xamax and FC Lugano. He played 19 times for the Switzerland national football team and was a participant at the 1996 UEFA European Championship.

References

1970 births
Living people
Swiss men's footballers
Swiss Super League players
Neuchâtel Xamax FCS players
Servette FC players
FC Lugano players
FC Chiasso players
GC Biaschesi players
FC Fribourg players
UEFA Euro 1996 players
Switzerland international footballers
Association football defenders
People from Neuchâtel
Sportspeople from the canton of Neuchâtel